HLM is a commune d'arrondissement of the city of Dakar, Senegal. As of 2013 it had a population of 39,126. HLM stands for Habitations à Loyer Modéré (Homes for moderate rents).

Arrondissements of Dakar